Bob Bryan and Mike Bryan were the defending champions, but did not participate this year.

Xavier Malisse and Olivier Rochus won the title, defeating Simon Aspelin and Todd Perry 7–6(7–5), 6–4 in the final.

Seeds

  Gastón Etlis /  Martín Rodríguez (second round)
  Wayne Arthurs /  Paul Hanley (second round)
  Xavier Malisse /  Olivier Rochus (champions)
  Simon Aspelin /  Todd Perry (final)

Draw

External links
 2005 Next Generation Hardcourts Doubles draw

Doubles